McNeilus Maranatha Christian College (An Adventist Center of Higher Learning), formerly known as Maranatha Christian College - MCC, is a Seventh-day Adventist Christian school in Kalaymyo, Myanmar (Burma). It is owned and operated by Myanmar Union Conference of Seventh-day Adventists. It was established in 2000 and is a part of the Seventh-day Adventist education system, the world's second largest Christian school system.

Location
MMCC is located on Khaing Shwe Waa Rd, Chamie Aungshii, PO 02091, Kalaymyo, Sagaing Division, Myanmar.

Degree courses
The college offers the following courses:
Bachelor of Arts in Education
Bachelor of Arts in Religion
Bachelor of Ministry

See also

 List of Seventh-day Adventist colleges and universities
 Seventh-day Adventist education

References

2000 establishments in Myanmar
Universities and colleges affiliated with the Seventh-day Adventist Church
Buildings and structures in Sagaing Region
Christian colleges in Myanmar
Educational institutions established in 2000
Kale Township